The La Mède refinery is a biorefinery that previously operated as a traditional fossil fuel refinery owned by TotalEnergies in Châteauneuf-les Martigues  near Marseille, France, and on the Etang de Berre. The plant includes about 250 hectares.

The biorefinery has a capacity of 500,000 tones of biofuels (hydrotreated vegetable oil) a year. The plant conversion, started in 2015, finished in 2019 with EUR 275 million of capital expenditure.  In 2021, the plant announced production of aviation biofuel made from cooking oil.

A 2018 agreement with the French government capped the amount of palm oil production at the facility at 300 000 tonnes, while requiring at least 50 000 tonnes of French-grown rapeseed oil.

Environmental activists have criticized the plant for its reliance on palm oil, which has a track record of global environmental destruction and human rights violations. Local farmers represented by Fédération nationale des syndicats d'exploitants agricoles also expressed concerns about palm oil competing with local oil production.

History 
The plant entered operation in 1935 as a crude oil and petrochemical plant. The plant stopped production of petroleum in 2016.

In 1992 the plant had a gas explosion.

References 

Oil refineries in France